Lawndale is a community in Logan County, Illinois, United States which lies northeast of Springfield. The town lies on Interstate 55, part of the old Route 66, between Atlanta and Lincoln. The town lies just south of Kickapoo Creek.  The town has one tavern, a grain elevator, and a converted mobile home as its post office.

Lawndale was laid out and platted in 1854, soon after the Alton & Sangamon (now Chicago & Alton) railroad was extended to that point. A post office called Lawndale has been in operation since 1855.

References 

Populated places in Logan County, Illinois